Blue Night is the fifth studio album by Danish soft rock band Michael Learns to Rock (MLTR). It was released on 1 November 2000 by Medley Records (EMI). The album was produced by Boe Larsen with band member Mikkel Lentz, who makes his debut as a songwriter on the song "Tell It to Your Heart". It is the first Michael Learns to Rock album since the departure of bass guitar player Søren Madsen in July 2000; however, his name is still credited on "More Than a Friend". This album was remastered by ADMS on Warner Music label in 2014 due to Michael Learns to Rock 25th anniversary celebrations.

Track listing

Charts

References

2000 albums
Michael Learns to Rock albums